Vincent Challacombe Watts OBE (born 11 August 1940) is a British academic and businessman.

He was educated at Sidcot School, Peterhouse, Cambridge (MA, Molecular Biology), and at the University of Birmingham (MSc). He served as Vice-Chancellor of the University of East Anglia  from 1997 to 2002, leaving to focus full-time on his role as Chairman of the East of England Development Agency. Prior to joining the University of East Anglia he was at Andersen Consulting.

References

1940 births
Living people
Alumni of Peterhouse, Cambridge
Alumni of the University of Birmingham
Vice-Chancellors of the University of East Anglia
Academics of the University of East Anglia
Officers of the Order of the British Empire
People educated at Sidcot School